Untersteinach is a municipality in the district of Kulmbach in Bavaria in Germany.

City arrangement
Untersteinach is arranged in the following boroughs:

 Gumpersdorf
 Hummendorf
 Untersteinach

References

Kulmbach (district)